Victoria Vetri (born September 26, 1944; also known as Angela Dorian and Victoria Rathgeb) is an American model and actress.

Early life and education
Vetri was born in the Queen of Angels Hospital in Los Angeles, California, to Italian immigrant parents. She attended Hollywood High School between 1959-63 and later studied art at Los Angeles City College. She began acting and modeling in her teens.

Career

Television and films
While Vetri was in high school director Robert Wise considered casting her as Maria in the 1961 film West Side Story, but the studio selected Natalie Wood.

In her early career Vetri often was cast in ethnic roles on television "due to her Italian heritage", such as a Native American in Cheyenne and a Mexican in Wagon Train. She also landed ethnic roles in film, including a member of an ancient Maya civilization in the 1963 film Kings of the Sun and a Mexican in the 1967 film Chuka.

Vetri appeared briefly in the 1968 film Rosemary's Baby, where she was credited as Angela Dorian. In one scene, Rosemary (Mia Farrow) remarks to Vetri's character, Teresa, that she resembles the actress Victoria Vetri.

In January 1969, Vetri signed a multi-picture contract with Warner Bros.-Seven Arts and was given a starring role in When Dinosaurs Ruled the Earth. She refused to have her hair turned blonde from its natural auburn for the film. The story required a blonde, so Vetri demanded a wig instead. Columnist Hy Gardner nominated Vetri as "a new sex symbol on the Hollywood horizon" in 1971.
In 2018, Vetri reportedly claimed she plans to return to acting.

Star Trek
Vetri has been incorrectly identified in numerous sources as playing the role of the "human form of a shape-shifting cat" in the Star Trek episode "Assignment: Earth" (a role actually played by April Tatro). Vetri emphatically states she never appeared on Star Trek, saying, "I was never in an episode of STAR TREK. I know that people think I was [...] I am not sure who she was. Look close enough and you can see that she has blue eyes and I, of course, have brown."

Playboy
Using the name Angela Dorian, Vetri was Playboys Playmate of the Month for the September 1967 issue and subsequently was the 1968 Playmate of the Year. Vetri won $20,000 and a new car (an all pink 1968 AMC AMX) when she was selected Playmate of the Year. A nude photo of her (along with fellow playmates Leslie Bianchini, Reagan Wilson, and Cynthia Myers) was inserted into Apollo 12 Extra-vehicular activity astronaut cuff checklists by pranksters at NASA.

Thinking it would give her the pick of acting roles, Vetri took on modelling for Playboy. However, she said that posing actually hindered her career by limiting the roles she was offered. She felt she was typecast because of her beauty.

Vetri posed topless for the April 1984 Playboy pictorial Playmates Forever! Part Two. In Tom Clancy's 2004 biography of Gen. Tony Zinni, USMC (Ret.), Zinni remarks on receiving a copy of the September 1967 Playboy centerfold from his advisers for his birthday, which he kept as a memento of his time in Vietnam.

Personal life
Vetri, aged 18, married Hugh Terry Whettam on April 7, 1963. Their son was born on September 8, 1963. They were divorced in 1966. She then married John Lee Hage on December 29, 1966, and they were divorced in 1967. Vetri married Heinz Gottfried Schwetz on November 13, 1978 and they were divorced on February 25, 1983. In 1986, she and Bruce Rathgeb were married.

Vetri was charged with attempted murder after  shooting husband Bruce Rathgeb from close range inside the Hollywood apartment they were sharing after an argument on Saturday, October 16, 2010.

The Los Angeles Police Department's Hollywood Division arrested Vetri. She was jailed on US$1.53 million bail. Los Angeles Superior Court Judge Michael D. Abzug refused to reduce it, pending trial. In January 2011, the judge also denied her attorney's request for a reduction of the charge of attempted murder. She was ordered to stand trial on that charge.

Between January and September 2011, the charge against Vetri was reduced to attempted voluntary manslaughter. She entered a plea of no contest. The judge sentenced her to nine years in state prison. She and Rathgeb divorced in 2016. She was released on parole in April 2018, aged 73.

Filmography

Film

Television

See also
 List of people in Playboy 1960–1969

References

Bibliography

External links
 

1944 births
American film actresses
American people of Italian descent
Living people
Actresses from San Francisco
1960s Playboy Playmates
Playboy Playmates of the Year
Los Angeles City College alumni
20th-century American actresses
American television actresses
People convicted of attempted voluntary manslaughter
21st-century American women